Olearia, most commonly known as daisy-bush, is a genus of flowering plants belonging to the family Asteraceae, the largest of the flowering plant families in the world. Olearia  are found in Australia, New Guinea and New Zealand. The genus includes herbaceous plants, shrubs and small trees. The latter are unusual among the Asteraceae and are called tree daisies in New Zealand.  All bear the familiar daisy-like composite flowerheads in white, pink, mauve or purple.

Description
Plants in the genus Olearia are shrubs of varying sizes, characterised by a composite flower head arrangement with single-row ray florets enclosed by small overlapping bracts arranged in rows. The flower petals are more or less equal in length. The centre of the bi-sexual floret is disc shaped and may be white, yellowish or purplish, generally with 5 lobes. Flower heads may be single or clusters in leaf axils or at the apex of branchlets.  Leaves may be smooth, glandular or with a sticky secretion. The leaves may grow opposite, alternate, arranged sparsely or clustered. Leaf margins either entire or lobed, with or without a stalk. The fruit are dry slightly compressed, one-seeded, narrow-elliptic or egg-shaped with longitudinal ridges and smooth or with sparse hairs.

Taxonomy and naming
The genus Olearia was first described in 1802 by Conrad Moench in Supplementum ad Methodum Plantas and is named after Johann Gottfried Olearius, a 17th-century German scholar and author of Specimen Florae Hallensis. Originally a large genus, a molecular study has found it to be polyphyletic.

Distribution
There are approximately 180 species of Olearia, of which about 112 species are endemic to Australia. Olearia are found in all states of Australia.

Species

The following is a list of Olearia species accepted by the Australian Plant Census or the New Zealand Plant Conservation Network or listed in the Census of Vascular Plants of Papua New Guinea as at May 2021:
 
Olearia adenocarpa Molloy (N.Z.)
Olearia adenolasia (F.Muell.) F.Muell. ex Benth. – woolly-glandular daisy-bush (W.A.)
Olearia aglossa (Betche & Maiden)  Lander (N.S.W., Vic.)
Olearia albida (Hook.f.) Hook.f. – tanguru (N.Z.) 
Olearia algida N.A.Wakef. – alpine daisy-bush (N.S.W., A.C.T., Vic. Tas.)
Olearia allomii Kirk – Great Barrier tree daisy (N.Z.)
Olearia alpicola F.Muell. ex Benth. – alpine daisy-bush (N.S.W., Vic.)
Olearia angulata (Kirk) Allan (N.Z.)
Olearia angustifolia Hook.f. – teteaweka (N.Z.)
Olearia arborescens (G.Forst.) Cockayne & Laing – common tree daisy, glossy tree daisy (N.Z.)
Olearia archeri Lander (Tas.)
Olearia arckaringensis P.J.Lang – Arckaringensis daisy (S.A.) 
Olearia argophylla (Labill.) F.Muell. ex Benth. – musk daisy-bush, native musk, silver shrub (N.S.W., Vic.)
Olearia arguta Benth. (W.A., N.T., Qld.)
 Olearia arguta Benth. var. arguta (W.A., N.T.) 
 Olearia arguta var. lanata Benth. (W.A., N.T., Qld.)
Olearia arida E.Pritz. (W.A., S.A., N.T.)
Olearia asterotricha (F.Muell.) Benth. – rough daisy-bush (N.S.W., Vic.)
Olearia astroloba Lander & N.G.Walsh – marble daisy-bush (Vic.)
Olearia avicenniifolia (Raoul) Hook.f. – akeake  (N.Z.)
Olearia axillaris (DC.) F.Muell. ex Benth. – coast daisy-bush (W.A., S.A., N.S.W., Vic., Tas.)
Olearia ballii (F.Muell.) Hemsl. – mountain daisy (Lord Howe Island)
Olearia brachyphylla (F.Muell. ex Sond.) N.A.Wakef. (W.A., S.A.)
Olearia brevipedunculata N.G.Walsh (N.S.W., Vic.)
Olearia bullata H.D.Wilson & Garn.-Jones (N.Z.)
Olearia burgessii Lander (N.S.W.)
Olearia calcarea F.Muell. ex Benth. – limestone daisy bush (W.A., S.A., Vic., N.S.W.)
Olearia canescens (Benth.) Hutch. (N.S.W., Qld.)
Olearia cassiniae (F.Muell.) F.Muell. ex Benth. (W.A.)
Olearia chathamica Kirk (N.Z.)
Olearia cheesmanii Cockayne & Allan – streamside tree daisy (N.Z.) 
Olearia chrysophylla  (DC.) Benth. (N.S.W., Qld.)
Olearia ciliata (Benth.) F.Muell. ex Benth. – fringed daisy-bush (W.A., S.A., Vic., Tas.)
Olearia colensoi Hook.f. – tupare, leatherwood (N.Z.)
Olearia cordata Lander (N.S.W.)
Olearia covenyi Lander (N.S.W.)
Olearia coriacea Kirk (N.Z.)
Olearia crebra E.K.Cameron & Heenan (N.Z.)
Olearia crosby-smithiana Petrie (N.Z.)
Olearia cuneifolia A.R.Bean & M.T.Mathieson (Qld.)
Olearia curticoma N.G.Walsh (Vic.)
Olearia cydoniifolia (DC.) Benth. (Qld., N.S.W.)
Olearia cymbifolia (Hook.f.) Cheeseman (N.Z.)
Olearia decurrens  (DC.) Benth. – clammy daisy-bush (W.A., S.A., N.S.W., Vic.)
Olearia durifolia J.Kost. (P.N.G.)
Olearia elaeophila (A.Cunn. ex DC.) F.Muell. ex Benth. (W.A.)
Olearia elliptica DC. – sticky daisy-bush (Qld., N.S.W.)
Olearia eremaea Lander (W.A.)
Olearia ericoides (Steetz) N.A.Wakef. (Tas.)
Olearia erubescens (Sieber ex Spreng.) Dippel (S.A., N.S.W., A.C.T., Vic., Tas.) – pink-tip daisy-bush, moth daisy-bush
Olearia exiguifolia (F.Muell.) F.Muell. ex Benth. (W.A., S.A.)
Olearia ferresii (F.Muell.) Benth. (W.A., N.T., S.A., Qld.)
Olearia fimbriata Heads  (N.Z.)
Olearia floccosa J.Kost. (P.N.G.)
Olearia flocktoniae Maiden & Betche – Dorrigo daisy-bush (N.S.W.)
Olearia floribunda (Hook.f.) Benth. – heath daisy-bush (N.S.W., Vic., S.A.)
Olearia fluvialis Lander (W.A.)
Olearia fragrantissima Petrie (N.Z.)
Olearia frostii (F.Muell.) J.H.Willis – Bogong daisy-bush (Vic.)
Olearia furfuracea (A.Rich.) Hook.f. – akepiro (N.Z.) 
Olearia gardneri Heads (N.Z.)
Olearia glandulosa (Labill.) Benth. – swamp daisy-bush (S.A., Qld., N.S.W., A.C.T., Vic., Tas.)
Olearia glutinosa (Lindl.) Benth. – sticky daisy-bush (S.A., Vic. Tas.)
Olearia gordonii Lander (Qld.)
Olearia grandiflora Hook. – Mount Lofty daisy-bush (S.A.)
Olearia gravis (F.Muell.) Benth. (Qld., N.S.W.)
Olearia hectorii Hook.f. (N.Z.)
Olearia heterocarpa S.T.Blake – Nightcap daisy bush (Qld., N.S.W.)
Olearia heterolepis Mattf. (P.N.G.)
Olearia heterotricha Mattf. (P.N.G.)
Olearia homolepis (F.Muell.) Benth. (W.A.)
Olearia hooglandii J.Kost. (P.N.G.)
Olearia hookeri (Sond.) Benth. (Tas.)
Olearia humilis Lander (W.A.)
Olearia hygrophila (DC.) Benth. (Qld.)
Olearia ilicifolia Hook.f. – mountain holly (N.Z.)
Olearia imbricata (Turcz.) Benth. – imbricate daisy bush (W.A.)
Olearia incana (D.A.Cooke) Lander (W.A., S.A., Vic., N.S.W.)
Olearia incondita Lander (W.A.)
Olearia iodochroa (F.Muell.) Benth. – violet daisy-bush (N.S.W., Vic.)
Olearia kernotii F.Muell. (P.N.G.)
Olearia laciniifolia Lander (W.A.)
Olearia lacunosa Buchanan – lancewood tree daisy (N.Z.)
Olearia lanata  J.Kost (P.N.G.)
Olearia lanuginosa (J.H.Willis) N.A.Wakef. – woolly daisy bush (W.A., S.A., Vic.)
Olearia lasiophylla Lander (N.S.W.)
Olearia laxiflora  Kirk (N.Z.)
Olearia ledifolia (DC.) Benth. – rock daisy bush (Tas.)
Olearia lehmanniana (Steetz) Lander (W.A.)
Olearia lepidophylla (Pers.) Benth. – club-moss daisy-bush (W.A., S.A., N.S.W., Vic., Tas.)
Olearia lepidota Mattf. (P.N.G.)
Olearia leptocephala J.Kost (P.N.G.)
Olearia liniata (Kirk) Cockayne (N.Z.)
Olearia lirata (Sims) Hutch. – snowy daisy-bush (N.S.W., A.C.T., Vic., Tas.)
Olearia lyallii Hook.f. – subantarctic tree daisy (N.Z.)
Olearia macdonnellensis D.A.Cooke (N.T.)
Olearia magniflora (F.Muell.) Benth. – splendid daisy-bush (W.A.,, S.A., N.S.W., Vic.)
Olearia megalophylla (F.Muell.) F.Muell. ex Benth. – large-leaf daisy-bush (N.S.W., A.C.T., Vic.)
Olearia microdisca J.M.Black (S.A.)
Olearia microphylla (Vent.) Maiden & Betche  – small-leaf daisy-bush (Qld., N.S.W., A.C.T.)
Olearia minor (Benth.) Lander  (N.S.W., Vic., S.A., W.A.)
Olearia montana Lander  (N.S.W.)
Olearia monticola F.M.Bailey (P.N.G.)
Olearia mooneyi (F.Muell.) Hemsl. (L.H.I)
Olearia moschata Hook.f. (N.Z.)
Olearia mucronata Lander  (W.A.)
Olearia muelleri (Sond.) Benth. – Goldfields daisy, Mueller's daisy bush (W.A., S.A., Vic., N.S.W.)
Olearia muricata (Steetz) Benth. – rough-leaved daisy bush (W.A.)
Olearia myrsinoides (Labill.) F.Muell. ex Benth. – blush daisy-bush, silky daisy-bush (N.S.W., A.C.T., Vic., Tas.)
Olearia nernstii  (F.Muell.) F.Muell. ex Benth. (Qld., N.S.W.)
Olearia newbeyi Lander (W.A.)
Olearia nummulariifolia (Hook.f.) Hook.f. (N.Z.)
Olearia obcordata (Hook.f.) Benth. (Tas.)
Olearia occidentissima Lander (W.A.)
Olearia odorata  Petrie – scented tree daisy (N.Z.) 
Olearia oliganthema F.Muell. ex Benth. (N.S.W.)
Olearia oporina (G.Forst.) Hook.f. (N.Z.)
Olearia oppositifolia (F.Muell.) Lander (Qld., N.S.W.)
Olearia orientalis A.R.Bean & Jobson (Qld.)
Olearia pachycephala J.Kost (P.N.G.)
Olearia pachyphylla Cheeseman (N.Z.)
Olearia pallida J.Kost (P.N.G.)
Olearia paniculata (J.R.Forst. & G.Forst.) Druce (N.Z.) – akiraho
Olearia pannosa Hook. – velvet daisy-bush (S.A., Vic.)
Olearia passerinoides (Turcz.) Benth. (W.A., S.A., N.S.W., Vic.)
Olearia paucidentata (Steetz.) F.Muell. ex Benth. (W.A.)
Olearia persoonioides (DC.) Benth. (Tas.)
Olearia phlogopappa (Labill.) DC. – dusty daisy-bush, alpine daisy-bush (N.S.W., A.C.T., Vic., Tas.)
Olearia picridifolia (F.Muell.) Benth. (W.A., S.A., Vic.)
Olearia pimeleoides (DC.) Benth. – pimelea daisy-bush (W.A., S.A., Qld., N.S.W., Vic.) 
Olearia pinifolia (Hook.f.) Benth. (Tas.)
Olearia platyphylla Mattf. (P.N.G.)
Olearia plucheacea Lander (W.A.)
Olearia polita H.D.Wilson & Garn.-Jones (N.Z.)
Olearia quercifolia Sieber ex DC. – oak-leaved daisy-bush (N.S.W.)
Olearia quinquevulnera Heenan (N.Z.)
Olearia racemosa Domin (Qld.)
Olearia ramosissima (DC.) Benth. (W.A., Qld., N.S.W.)
Olearia ramulosa (Labill.) Benth. – twiggy daisy-bush (S.A., Qld., N.S.W., A.C.T., Vic., Tas.)
Olearia rani  (A.Cunn.) Druce – heketara (N.Z.)
Olearia revoluta Benth. (W.A.)
Olearia rosmarinifolia (DC.) Benth. (Qld., N.S.W.)
Olearia rudis (Benth.) F.Muell. ex Benth. (S.A., N.S.W., Vic.)
Olearia rufa J.Kost (P.N.G.)
Olearia rugosa (F.Muell. ex W.Archer bis) Hutch. – wrinkled daisy-bush (N.S.W., Vic., Tas.)
Olearia solandri (Hook.f.) Hook.f. – coastal tree daisy (N.Z.) 
Olearia speciosa Hutch. (Vic.)
Olearia spectabilis J.Kost (P.N.G.)
Olearia stellulata (Labill.) DC. (Vic., Tas.)
Olearia stenophylla N.G.Walsh (N.S.W.)
Olearia stilwelliae Blakely (N.S.W.)
Olearia strigosa (Steetz) Benth. – bristly daisy bush (W.A.)
Olearia stuartii (F.Muell.) Benth. (W.A., N.T., S.A., Qld.)
Olearia subspicata (Hook.) Benth. (W.A., N.T., S.A., Qld., N.S.W., Vic.)
Olearia suffruticosa D.A.Cooke – clustered daisy-bush (S.A., N.S.W., Vic.)
Olearia tasmanica W.M.Curtis (Tas.)
Olearia telmatica Heenan & de Lange – shell akeake, swamp akeake  (N.Z.)
Olearia tenuifolia (DC.) Benth. – thin-leaf daisy-bush (N.S.W., A.C.T., Vic.)
Olearia teretifolia (Sond.) Benth. – cypress daisy-bush (S.A., Vic.)
Olearia tomentosa (J.C.Wendl.) Benth. – toothed daisy-bush (N.S.W., Vic.)
Olearia towsonii Cheeseman – Coromandel tree daisy (N.Z.)
Olearia traversiorum (F.Muell.) Hook.f. – hakapiri, Chatham Island akeake (N.Z.)
Olearia trifurcata Lander (W.A.)
Olearia tubuliflora (Sond. & F.Muell. ex Sond.) Benth. (S.A., Vic.)
Olearia velutina J.Kost (P.N.G.)
Olearia vernonioides C.T.White & Francis (P.N.G.)
Olearia virgata (Hook.f.) Hook.f. (N.Z.)
Olearia viscidula (F.Muell.) Benth. – viscid daisy-bush (N.S.W.)
Olearia viscosa (Labill.) Benth. – sticky daisy-bush (Vic., Tas.)
Olearia xerophila (F.Muell.) Benth. (W.A., Qld.)

Use in horticulture
Several species are cultivated as ornamental garden plants, and there are hybrids of uncertain or mixed parentage. Among these, the following have been given the Royal Horticultural Society’s Award of Garden Merit:-
Olearia macrodonta, New Zealand holly
Olearia × mollis ‘Zennorensis’, daisy bush ‘Zennorensis’ 
Olearia × scilloniensis 
Olearia × scilloniensis ‘Master Michael’ 

References

 
Asteraceae genera